Histopona luxurians is a funnel-web spider species found in Austria and South-Eastern Europe.

See also 
 List of Agelenidae species

References 

Histopona
Spiders of Europe
Spiders described in 1897